Maka-Kazmalyar is a rural locality (a selo) in Garakhsky Selsoviet, Magaramkentsky District, Republic of Dagestan, Russia. The population was 152 as of 2010. There are 2 streets.

Geography 
Maka-Kazmalyar is located 215 km southeast of Makhachkala, on the right bank of the Samur River. Garakh and Novoye Karakyure are the nearest rural localities.

Nationalities 
Lezgins live there.

References 

Rural localities in Magaramkentsky District